{{DISPLAYTITLE:C12H10O}}
The molecular formula C12H10O (molar mass: 170.21 g/mol, exact mass: 170.0732 u) may refer to:

 Diphenyl ether
 2-Phenylphenol, or o-phenylphenol